Dario Marešić (born 29 September 1999) is an Austrian professional footballer who plays as a defender for Croatian club Istra 1961 on loan from the French club Reims.

Career
On 9 May 2018, he played as Sturm Graz beat Red Bull Salzburg in extra time to win the 2017–18 Austrian Cup.

On 27 August 2019, Dario joined French side Stade de Reims.

On 12 July 2022, Marešić joined Istra 1961 in Croatia on loan with an option to buy.

Personal life
Born in Austria, Marešić is of Croatian descent. He is a youth international for Austria.

Career statistics

Club

Honours
Sturm Graz
 Austrian Cup: 2017–18

Individual
Austrian  Bundesliga Team of the Year:  2017–18

References

Living people
1999 births
Austrian footballers
Austria youth international footballers
Austrian people of Croatian descent
Association football defenders
SK Sturm Graz players
Stade de Reims players
LASK players
NK Istra 1961 players
Austrian Football Bundesliga players
Ligue 1 players
Championnat National 2 players
Austrian expatriate footballers
Austrian expatriate sportspeople in France
Expatriate footballers in France
Austrian expatriate sportspeople in Croatia
Expatriate footballers in Croatia